was published by Shogakukan between 1999 and 2010. It featured beautiful Japanese models and articles geared toward young men. Sabra Magazine was comparable to Maxim, FHM, and Stuff in the United States. Although the magazine focused on gravure models (and no nudity), it also offered variety of news such as showbiz entertainment, gadgets, and people. The magazine was published bi-weekly, starting from 11 May 2000 until 25 October 2007. However, on 24 November 2007 Sabra magazine began to be published monthly.

Aside from regular publication, Sabra also published several one-shot collection books in a magazine format focused on a single model or group of models throughout years.

Sabra magazine ceased publication in March 2010, only special edition magazine books are being published in print and the members only site.

A Sabra magazine cover (Year 2004, issue 011) was used in the well-received video game series "Metal Gear Solid". In "Metal Gear Solid 3: Snake Eater", the cover of said Sabra issue was used as representation of the "book" item in-game. The item is utilized as a distraction in the game.

References

External links
 Official Sabra magazine website 
 Sabra magazine cover archive 

1999 establishments in Japan
2010 disestablishments in Japan
Biweekly magazines published in Japan
Defunct magazines published in Japan
Magazines established in 1999
Magazines disestablished in 2010
Magazines published in Tokyo
Men's magazines published in Japan
Monthly magazines published in Japan